Ajahn Maha Bua (12 August 191330 January 2011) was a Thai Buddhist monk. He was thought by many of his followers to be an arahant (someone who has attained full enlightenment). He was a disciple of the esteemed forest master Ajahn Mun Bhuridatta, and was himself considered a master in the Thai Forest Tradition. Following the death of Ajahn Thate in 1994, he was considered to be the Ajahn Yai (or head monk) of the Thai Forest Tradition lineage until his death in 2011.

Biography

Early years 
Bua was born in Baan Taad village in the northeastern province of Udon Thani. He was one of 16 children of a rich family of rice farmers. When he was 21, his parents asked him to enter the monkhood for a season, a Thai tradition to show gratitude towards one's parents. He entered Yothanimit monastery and was ordained on 12 May 1934, with Venerable Chao Khun Dhammachedi as his preceptor. His preceptor gave him the Pali name Ñāṇasampanno, meaning 'one endowed with wisdom'. At the time, Bua had no intention of remaining a monk for the rest of his life.

As Phra Ñāṇasampanno, he studied the incarnations of the Buddha and his Arahant Disciples. He has said he was so impressed that he decided to seek the same enlightenment as had the Buddha's original disciples. He tried to understand the ways of practicing the Dhamma (Dharma) which would eventually lead to Nibbana (Nirvana).

He studied Pali, the language of the Theravada Buddhist scriptures, as well as the Vinaya (the Buddhist monastic rules). After seven years, he passed the third level of Pali studies, and achieved the highest level in Dhamma and Vinaya studies. He then concentrated entirely on the practice of Dhamma in hopes of studying with Venerable Ajahn Mun, one of the most renowned meditation masters of his time.

Venerable Ajahn Mun 

Nanasampanno then went in search of Venerable Ajahn Mun. When he finally met him, he was pleased with his efforts, since it seemed as if Mun already knew his desires, intentions, and doubts. Mun clarified the questions in his mind and showed him the paths leading to Nibbana still exist. Nanasampanno said to himself:

"Now, I have come to the real thing. He has made everything clear and I no longer have doubts. It is now up to me to be true or otherwise. I'm determined to be true!"

He learned the meditation methods followed by Mun, based on the principles of Buddhism and the code of Buddhist discipline. He continued to follow these methods in his own teaching of monks and novices. Due to his deep respect and admiration for Mun, whom he likens to a father and mother to his students, he was inspired to write a biography of Mun to disseminate his methods of practice and document his character for coming generations. He has also written 'Wisdom develops samadhi' and "Patipada' His transcribed talks he gave to laypeople and monks have formed several hundred books in Thai language, but only a few of his talks have been translated into English. He solely focuses on the practice of Buddhist meditation and has only one aim for his disciples: Reaching the end of dukkha. Several hundred of talks given to his monk disciples were recorded and several thousand of talks given to laypeople, normally after the meal or in the evening were also recorded. He allowed them to be recorded, so that his fellow practitioners may have a guide in the practice of meditation.

Seclusion and establishing a monastery 
In 1950, after the death of Mun, Bua sought a secluded place. He went to Huey Sai village in Mukdahan province. He was very strict and serious in teaching the monks and novices, both in the austere dhutanga practices and in meditation. He continued his teaching until these same principles became established amongst his followers.

Learning that his mother was ill, he returned home to look after her. Villagers and relatives requested that he settle  permanently in the forest south of the village and no longer wander in the manner of a forest monk. As his mother was very old and that it was appropriate for him to look after her, he accepted the offer. It was given the name Wat Pa Baan Taad.

Wat Pa Ban Taad 
Bua said:

"This monastery has always been a place for meditation. Since the beginning it has been a place solely for developing the mind. I haven't let any other work disturb the place. If there are things which must be done, I've made it a rule that they take up no more time than is absolutely necessary. The reason for this is that, in the eyes of the world and the Dhamma, this is a meditation temple. We're meditation monks. The work of the meditation monk was handed over to him on the day of his ordination by his Preceptor — in all its completeness. This is his real work, and it was taught in a form suitable for the small amount of time available during the ordination ceremony — five meditation objects to be memorized in forward and reverse order — and after that it's up to each individual to expand on them and develop them to whatever degree of breadth or subtlety he is able to. In the beginning the work of a monk is given simply as: Kesa — hair of the head, Loma — hair of the body, Nakha — nails, Danta — teeth, Taco — the skin which enwraps the body. This is the true work for those monks who practice according to the principles of Dhamma as were taught by the Lord Buddha."

The wilderness surrounding the monastery has vanished, as it has now been cleared for cultivation. The forest inside the monastery is all that remains. Wat Pa Baan Taad preserves this remnant in its original condition, so that monks, novices, and lay people can use its tranquility for the practice of the Dhamma as taught by the Lord Buddha.

Rise to fame 
Bua has traveled to London to give lectures. He also founded the Help Thai Nation Project, a charitable effort dedicated to helping the Thai economy. He has been visited and supported by the King Bhumibol Adulyadej and Queen Sirikit of Thailand.

Bua's biographer wrote:
"Ven. Ajahn Maha Bua is well known for the fluency and skill of his Dhamma talks, and their direct and dynamic approach. They obviously reflect his own attitude and the way he personally practiced Dhamma. This is best exemplified in the Dhamma talks he gives to those who go to meditate at Wat Pa Bahn Tahd. Such talks usually take place in the cool of the evening, with lamps lit and the only sound being the insects and cicadas in the surrounding jungle. He often begins the Dhamma talk with a few moments of stillness — this is the most preparation he needs — and then quietly begins the Dhamma exposition. As the theme naturally develops, the pace quickens and those listening increasingly feel its strength and depth."

Some basic teachings on the 'Citta' 

Bua observes the essential enduring truth of the sentient being as constituted of the indestructible reality of the citta (heart/mind). He has stated that as long as there is a nucleus of a Know-er (i.e. a 'self or Self' that knows) or nucleus of knowing-ness, the citta is not free. This nucleus is the 'Ultimate Danger' because of its alluring radiance that causes attachment.The nucleus of a Know-er within the citta, by extension, also makes the citta the Ultimate Danger because it is still not free of all defilements. The Ultimate Danger disguises itself as the Ultimate Virtue. The nucleus within the citta has many aspects, all of which are subject to being known and therefore subject to change. Upon being known, the known aspect of the nucleus ceases and another takes its place. When the perception of anatta (not-self) is applied to this nucleus, the agitated citta becomes calm and impassive with no interest in either atta (self) or anatta (not-self). At this moment, the perception of anatta causes the nucleus of the Know-er and knowing to 'flip over', and upon being let go it is totally destroyed, along with the ignorance that causes beings to wander in samsara.

This citta, which is intrinsically bright, clear, and aware, gets superficially tangled up in samsara but ultimately cannot be destroyed by any samsaric phenomenon. Although Bua is often at pains to emphasise the need for meditation upon the non-Self (anatta), he also points out that the citta, while getting caught up in the vortex of conditioned phenomena, is not subject to destruction as are those things which are impermanent, suffering, and non-Self (anicca, dukkha, anatta). The citta is ultimately not beholden to these laws of conditioned existence. The citta is bright, radiant, and deathless, and is its own independent reality.

The fundamental problem that besets human beings, according to Bua, is that they have taken fake and false things as their true self and lack the necessary power to be their 'own true self'; they allow the wiles and deceits of the mental defilements to generate fear and anxiety in their minds. Fear and anxiety are not inherent within the citta; in fact, the citta is ultimately beyond all such things and indeed is beyond time and space.  But it needs to be cleansed of its inner defilements (the kilesas) before that truth can be realised.

Bua goes on to attempt to describe the inner stages and experience of the cleansed citta. When its purgation of defilements is complete, it itself does not disappear – only the impermanent, suffering, and the non-Self disappear. The citta remains, experientially abiding in its own firm foundation, yet ultimately indescribable.

Some of the notions found here are reminiscent of the Tathagatagarbha tradition found in Mahayana Buddhism— although the latter posits an original, primordial purity to the mind, whereas Bua sees that purity as needing to be established through mental and moral cultivation.

Kammatthana 
Kammatthana literally means "basis of work" or "place of work". It describes the contemplation of certain meditation themes used by a meditating monk so the forces of defilement (kilesa), craving (tanha), and ignorance (avijja) may be uprooted from the mind. Although kammatthana can be found in many meditation-related subjects, the term is most often used to identify the forest tradition (the Kammatthana tradition) lineage founded by Ajahn Sao Kantasilo Mahathera and his student Ajahn Mun Bhuridatta Mahathera.

Notes

References

External links 

Luangta Maha Bua's homepage
Luangta Maha Bua's biography, Cremation, Legacy and history of Wat Pa Baan Taad
Arahattamagga Arahattaphala - The Path to Arahantship
Luangta Maha Bua's biography of Ajahn Mun
Patipada – Venerable Acariya Mun's Path of Practice. written by Ajahn Maha Bua
English Books
Dhammatalks in Thai 
Straight from the Heart, as translated from the Thai by Ṭhānissaro Bhikkhu at dhammatalks.org
Things As They Are, as translated from the Thai by Ṭhānissaro Bhikkhu at dhammatalks.org

1914 births
2011 deaths
Thai Theravada Buddhist monks
People from Udon Thani province